Sardar Israr Ullah Khan Gandapur (6 August 1975 – 16 October 2013) was a Pakistani politician who had been a member of the Khyber Pakhtunkhwa Assembly from 2002 to 2008 and again from 2008 to 2013 and then again from 2013 till his death. In his third tenure, he served as a Minister for Law, Parliamentary Affairs and Human Rights in the Khyber Pakhtunkhwa Assembly.

On 16 October 2013, he was killed by a suicide bomb blast on the first day of Eid al-Adha while greeting locals at his residence in Kulachi village.

Memorial 
After the death of Sardar Israr Ullah Khan Gandapur, a government college was named in his honor.

References

1975 births
2013 deaths
Pakistani terrorism victims
Assassinated Pakistani politicians
North-West Frontier Province MPAs 2002–2007
Khyber Pakhtunkhwa MPAs 2008–2013
Khyber Pakhtunkhwa MPAs 2013–2018
Pakistan Tehreek-e-Insaf politicians
People from Dera Ismail Khan District
Terrorism deaths in Pakistan
Israr Ullah Khan